Pelagio A. Cruz (June 16, 1912 – October 21, 1986) was the first Armed Forces of the Philippines Chief-of-Staff from the Philippine Air Force.

Early years

Pelagio Cruz was born on June 16, 1912 in Balag, Bulacan. He entered the Philippine Military Academy in 1972, and was commissioned as Third Lieutenant upon graduation in 1935.  He earned his wings in September 1936  at the Philippine Army Air Corps (PAAC) Running School in Camp Murphy.

Military career

At the outbreak of World War II Cruz was assigned as an executive officer of the PAAC Provisional Regiment in Bataan and joined the Bulacan Guerilla Unit after the surrender of the Philippines to the Imperial Japanese Army. 
After World War II he went on to take refresher course in Goodfellow Field in Texas, United States, and was later assigned as the Executive Officer of PAAC from March to May 1946. He became the commanding officer of Lipa Air Base from August 1946 to 8 June 1947, and further the acting chief of the Philippine Air Force from 9 June 1947 to 27 October 1947 at the temporary rank of colonel. He assumed the post as the commanding officer of the PAF from 28 October 1947 to 16 March 1951 and was promoted with a temporary rank of brigadier general on 20 May 1949.

Cruz then entered the Command General Staff College in Fort Leavenworth, United States in September 1951. Upon his return to the Philippines he was assigned as commandant of Command and General Staff School at Fort McKinley, Taguig.

He again took command of the PAF as commanding general, from 3 November 1953 to 31 July 1956, and his promotion to brigadier general was confirmed on 10 March 1954.

From 2 June 1958 to 31 December 1958, he became the chief of the Philippine Constabulary and was promoted to major general on 1 January 1959.  He was commissioned as the vice chief of staff for the AFP from 1 January 1959 to 30 December 1961, and eventually the chief of staff, AFP from December 1961 to 30 August 1962. He was promoted to the rank of lieutenant general on 1 January 1962.

Later years

Military retirement
He retired from the active military service on 1 September 1962.

Death
He died on October 21, 1986 at Quezon City, Philippines at the age of 74.

Awards
Silver Star
Gold Cross medal
Distinguished Unit Badge w/Two Oakleaf Clusters
Philippine Defense Ribbon with Two Bronze Victory Ribbon
Philippine Liberation Ribbon
Distinguished Service Star

See also

Philippine Air Force

External links
Lt. Gen. Pelagio Cruz page, PAF Website

1912 births
1986 deaths
Filipino generals
Chairmen of the Joint Chiefs (Philippines)
Philippine Military Academy alumni
Philippine Constabulary personnel
Recipients of the Silver Star
Recipients of the Distinguished Service Star
People from Bulacan
Philippine Air Force personnel
Philippine Army Air Corps
Filipino military aviators
Macapagal administration personnel
Filipino police chiefs
Garcia administration personnel